Martín García Ceniceros (also Martín García Gómez de Ceniceros)(died Oct 1632) was a Roman Catholic prelate who served as Inquisitor of Canarias,  Valencia, Cartagena, and Valladolid. He was appointed and briefly served as Bishop Elect of Almería (1632) but died before his consecration.

Biography
Martín García Ceniceros was born in Tenillono, Spain. He was ordained a priest in the Diocese of Calahorra and obtained a license in Theology and a doctorate in Canon Law. After his schooling, he was successively appointed the Inquisitor of the Diocese of Canarias, the Archdiocese of Valencia, the Diocese of Cartagena, and then the Diocese of Valladolid. After the death of Bishop Antonio Viedma Chaves, he was selected on 1 March 1632 by the King of Spain, Felipe IV and confirmed on 2 August 1632 by Pope Urban VIII as Bishop of Almería. Although he assumed the office and duties as Bishop, he died 2 months later in October 1632 and was never consecrated.

References 

1632 deaths
17th-century Roman Catholic bishops in Spain
Bishops appointed by Pope Urban VIII